Békéscsaba is a district in central-southern part of Békés County. Békéscsaba is also the name of the town where the district seat is found. The district is located in the Southern Great Plain Statistical Region.

Geography 
Békéscsaba District borders with Békés District to the north, Sarkad District and Gyula District to the east, Mezőkovácsháza District to the south, Orosháza District and Szarvas District to the west. The number of the inhabited places in Békéscsaba District is 9.

Municipalities 
The district has 1 urban county, 2 towns, 1 large village and 5 villages.
(ordered by population, as of 1 January 2012)

The bolded municipalities are cities, italics municipality is large village.

Demographics

In 2011, it had a population of 83,541 and the population density was 131/km².

Ethnicity
Besides the Hungarian majority, the main minorities are the Slovak (approx. 3,500), Roma (900), Romanian (500) and German (450).

Total population (2011 census): 83,541
Ethnic groups (2011 census): Identified themselves: 78,408 persons:
Hungarians: 72,018 (91.85%)
Slovaks: 3,504 (4.47%)
Gypsies: 916 (1.17%)
Others and indefinable: 1,970 (2.51%)
Approx. 5,000 persons in Békéscsaba District did not declare their ethnic group at the 2011 census.

Religion
Religious adherence in the county according to 2011 census:

Catholic – 17,821 (Roman Catholic – 17,627; Greek Catholic – 184);
Evangelical – 9,444; 
Reformed – 6,031;
Orthodox – 149;
other religions – 1,404; 
Non-religious – 26,364; 
Atheism – 1,289;
Undeclared – 21,039.

Gallery

See also
List of cities and towns of Hungary

References

External links
 Postal codes of the Békéscsaba District

Districts in Békés County